Norfleet is an unincorporated community in Pulaski County, in the U.S. state of Kentucky.

History
A post office called Norfleet was established in 1906, and remained in operation until 1962. The community has the name of Wyatt Norfleet, a local merchant.

References

Unincorporated communities in Pulaski County, Kentucky